Jeff Bloemberg (born January 31, 1968) is a Canadian former professional ice hockey defenceman who played four seasons in the National Hockey League with the New York Rangers from 1988–89 to 1991–92.

Born in Listowel, Ontario, Bloemberg was drafted in the fifth round, 93rd overall, in the 1986 NHL Entry Draft by the Rangers. He played forty-three career NHL games, scoring three goals and six assists for nine points. He also played seven career playoff games, tabulating three assists.

Career statistics

References

External links
 

1968 births
Adirondack Red Wings players
Berlin Capitals players
Binghamton Rangers players
Canadian ice hockey defencemen
Denver Rangers players
Living people
New York Rangers draft picks
New York Rangers players
North Bay Centennials players
People from Perth County, Ontario
Revier Löwen players
Springfield Indians players
Cape Breton Oilers players